Rechab ( Rēḵāḇ) is the name of three men in the Bible:

One of the two "captains of bands" whom Saul's son Ish-bosheth took into his service, and who conspired to kill him. (2 Samuel 4:2) 
A Kenite, mentioned as the father of Jehonadab at King Jehu's time, from whom the tribe of the Rechabites derived their name. Jehonadab and his people had all along become worshippers of God.
The father of Malchiah, ruler of part of Beth-haccerem. (Nehemiah 3:14)

See also 
Rahab
Rechabites

References

People of the kingdom of Israel (united monarchy)
Books of Kings people
Regicides
11th-century BC people
Set index articles on Hebrew Bible people